Bengt Brunskog (1920–2000) was a Swedish stage, film and television actor.

Selected filmography
 Fransson the Terrible (1941)
 Katrina (1943)
 Realm of Man (1949)
 Summer with Monika (1953)
 Synnöve Solbakken (1957)
 Seventeen Years Old (1957)
 Line Six (1958)
 Mannequin in Red (1958)
 We at Väddö (1958)
 The Phantom Carriage (1958)
 Rider in Blue (1959)
 Lend Me Your Wife (1959)
 When Darkness Falls (1960)
 Loving Couples (1964)
 I, a Woman (1965)

References

Bibliography
 Steene, Birgitta. Ingmar Bergman: A Reference Guide. Amsterdam University Press, 2005.
 Wright, Rochelle. The Visible Wall: Jews and Other Ethnic Outsiders in Swedish Film. SIU Press, 1998.

External links

1920 births
2000 deaths
Swedish male film actors
Swedish male stage actors
Swedish male television actors
People from Stockholm